Alison's Birthday is a 1981 Australian horror film, written and directed by Ian Coughlan, produced by the Australian Film Commission, Fontana Films and the Seven Network, and starring Joanne Samuel, Lou Brown, Bunney Brooke, John Bluthal, and Vincent Ball. It follows a teenage girl who finds herself the subject of a sinister ritual planned to take place on her 19th birthday.

Plot
Sixteen-year-old Alison Findlay, along with two of her female classmates, Chrissie and Maureen, play with a ouija board. During the session, Chrissie apparently becomes possessed by an entity claiming to be Alison's father, warning her that something bad will occur on her 19th birthday. Moments later, a bookcase collapses on Chrissie, killing her.

Nearly three years later, Alison has her boyfriend Pete accompany her to their hometown for her 19th birthday. Alison returns to the home of her Aunt Jenny and Uncle Dean, both of whom raised Alison from infancy after her parents died in a car accident. Near their home, Alison discovers a large stone construct in the woods resembling Stonehenge. Uncle Dean tells Alison the construct was built by the home's previous owner, who was an enthusiast of ancient history. Later that night, Alison is awoken in bed by a strange elderly woman whom she does not know. Her Aunt Jenny informs Alison that the woman is Alison's 103-year-old Grandmother Thorne, whom she has never met.

Dean and Jenny take an immediate dislike to Pete, and make numerous attempts to keep him away from Alison. However, Pete remains persistent in visiting her. To prevent him from returning, Dean and Jenny drug Alison, causing her to fall ill, and summon a false doctor to diagnose her. The imposter physician prescribes that she stay home and avoid visitors. That night, Pete breaks into the home to rescue Alison, but is stopped by the doctor and Dean who subdue and drug them both. Jenny and Dean manage to coach the inebriated Alison into telling the police that Pete has been stalking her, causing him to be arrested.

After Pete is freed on bail the following day, he begins researching the details of Alison's birthparents at the library. Along with the help of his friend Sally, a freelancing astrologer with some education on the occult, he determines that Alison's aunt and uncle are in fact not her aunt and uncle at all, but members of a Celtic cult who kidnapped her from the hospital as a child based on her birth time, which was exactly 19:00 (7:00 p.m.). Pete surmises that Dean and Jenny plan to sacrifice Alison to a Celtic demon named Mirna, who is commonly associated with the number 19. Pete and Sally suspect that Mirna inhabits the body of Grandmother Thorne.

Pete is accosted by members of the cult who attempt to kill him in an abandoned cemetery, but he manages to escape. Armed with a pistol and a crucifix, Pete returns to Dean and Jenny's home that night to stop the ritual, and finds Alison at the stone monolith in the woods along with Jenny, Dean, and other supposed family members—including Grandmother Thorne—all donning druid shawls. Alison pleads for Pete to throw the crucifix at the cultists to deter them. He agrees, and the two flee through the forest. In a clearing, Pete trips and falls, dropping his gun. Alison retrieves it, only to tell him that he was too late—the cultists have already completed their soul transference, resulting in Mirna inhabiting the young Alison's body, while Alison's soul is now inhabiting the infirm body of Grandmother Thorne. She proceeds to shoot Pete to death.

When police arrive, Dean, Jenny, and Alison (now Mirna) assure them that Pete had arrived to crash Alison's birthday party with nefarious intentions, planning to kidnap her, and accidentally died in a scuffle when his gun discharged. Based on Pete's arrest the night before, detectives believe the story to be true. After police leave, Jenny and Dean visit Grandmother Thorne (now Alison) as she awakens in her bed. Alison is initially oblivious to what has occurred, but screams in horror when she sees her aged hands, realizing that her soul has been transferred to the 104-year-old body of Grandmother Thorne.

Cast

Production
The film was shot in Sydney and other New South Wales locations, over three weeks in January and February 1979.

Release
Alison's Birthday was released in Australia on 26 December 1981.

Critical response
Meaghan Morris of the Sydney Morning Herald deemed the film a "letdown" overall, but conceded that it was "well made, mildly entertaining, and occasionally funny."

The film was nominated for various Australian film awards, including one for "Best Performance For a Male" for Vincent Ball.

Home media
The film was released on Blu-ray in the United States by Severin Films in December 2021 as part of their box set "All the Haunts Be Ours", a compendium of various international folk horror films.

References

Sources

External links

Alison's Birthday at Oz Movies

1981 films
1981 horror films
Australian horror films
Australian independent films
Australian supernatural horror films
Body swapping in films
Demons in film
Films about birthdays
Films about consciousness transfer
Films about cults
Films about orphans
Films about spirit possession
Films based on Celtic mythology
Folk horror films
1980s English-language films